, formerly known as , is a steel roller coaster located at Fuji-Q Highland in Fujiyoshida, Yamanashi, Japan. Manufactured by S&S – Sansei Technologies, the launched coaster uses compressed air to propel its trains. Steel fabrication was provided by Intermountain Lift, Inc.
In 2021, the ride was closed down indefinitely after multiple complaints of the ride breaking riders' bones were raised.

History

Dodonpa closed in 2016 for a major renovation. The ride's top hat was removed and replaced with a  vertical loop, announced in a February 2017 press release from the manufacturer. Dodonpa reopened on 15 July 2017. The renovation made Dodonpa the world's first air-powered coaster to feature an inversion, as well as the fastest coaster in the world with an inversion.

Ride experience

The name of the ride stems from the deep, ominous drumming sound that flows from the speakers as passengers wait in line to board the train. This repetitive percussive music is created by taiko drums, an old traditional Japanese drum that was used to demonstrate power and influence in pre-modern Japanese villages. These drums were supposedly used in warfare to rally troops and scare off the enemy with their thundering sound.

While waiting in line, riders hear the drums played through speakers, building up tension and excitement. Often, riders will chant along with the drum sound, which plays three consecutive beats represented by the sounds Do-don-pa.

Once passengers board the ride, the train moves them from the loading station to the launch pad, where it waits, allowing time for the compressed air to build up. When the ride is ready to launch, a voice in English says "Launch time!" and begins a three-second countdown to launch.

The train then enters a slight left turn before hitting a brake run. A second left turn followed by a right U-turn, both taken at slower speeds, brings the train back to the station.

The ride has a total of 4 trains with 4 cars per train. Each car seats 2 riders side-by-side, resulting in a total capacity of 8 riders per train.

Characteristics
By comparison, astronauts only experience 3 g at liftoff, though for a duration substantially longer than 1.6 seconds.

Before Do-Dodonpa's initial opening, only two roller coasters reached or went beyond the  barrier. As of 2020, that number stands at six (including Do-Dodonpa): Superman: Escape from Krypton; Red Force; Top Thrill Dragster; Kingda Ka; Do-Dodonpa; and Formula Rossa, the world's fastest roller coaster. Furthermore, Tower of Terror II, which was previously known as Tower of Terror, once traveled at least , but it is currently no longer in operation.

Incidents

Since its opening in 2001, Do-Dodonpa has had several incidents resulting in injury to passengers.

On 15 May 2007, a 37-year-old man sustained a minor injury when a plastic cover at the front of the train came loose and hit his right knee. The man was not badly injured because the plastic cover disconnected near the end of the ride when the train had slowed down significantly. The park operator stated that the cover likely came off due to cracks created over time by vibrations in the train. Further inspection of the other trains showed no similar damage.

From December 2020 to August 2021, there were 18 injuries sustained while riding Do-Dodonpa, which included nine incidents of broken bones. Fuji-Q Highland owner Hiroaki Iwata apologized for the injuries at a press conference speech on August 31, and an official investigation of these incidents has been ongoing since December 2020.

References

External links
 Official site 

Fuji-Q Highland
Thrust Air 2000
Roller coasters in Japan